The Herbert Samuel restaurant is a kosher fine-dining restaurant in Herzliya, Israel. It was established as a branch of a non-kosher restaurant in  Tel Aviv that has since closed.  

Herbert Samuel in Tel Aviv often appeared on lists of top restaurants; it was so listed by La Liste and by the French Foreign Ministry.

In 2016 Herbert Samuel opened a kosher edition in Herzliya; Yonatan Roshfeld was the chef.  In 2016 Herbert Samuel opened a Jerusalem branch, in the Herbert Samuel Hotel, which was kosher. The restaurant in Jerusalem "closed" the same year. In reality, it continued operating as the dining hall of the Herbert Samuel Hotel but it is no longer branded as the Herbert Samuel restaurant. There are additional Herbert Samuel hotels in Israel in a similar setup.

The signature dish of the Herzliya restaurant, located in the Ritz Carlton Hotel, is a tomato salad made with seven varieties of tomatoes, tossed together with olives, radishes, onion, scallion, and fresh basil by chef Kobi Obayon.

The Tel Aviv Herbert Samuel closed in August of 2016.

References

External links

 Herbert Samuel Restaurant

Restaurants in Israel
Restaurants in Jerusalem
Fleischig restaurants
Restaurants in Tel Aviv
Defunct restaurant chains in Israel